Euriphene veronica, the Veronica nymph, is a butterfly in the family Nymphalidae. It is found in Guinea, Sierra Leone, Liberia, southern Ivory Coast and western Ghana. The habitat consists of forests.

References

Butterflies described in 1780
Euriphene